John C. Lynch was an American lawyer, manager, and Republican politician, who is best known for serving as Speaker of the California State Assembly in 1895.

Life 
Lynch was born on November 23rd, 1851 in Ashland, Ohio. His father was an immigrant from Ireland who fought for the Ohio State Militia during the American Civil War. Lynch attended the University of Louisiana (now Tulane University) and received a Juris Doctor degree from the University of Chicago. He was assistant State Engineer of Louisiana and resident engineer for the Texas and Pacific Railway before he was admitted to the bar in 1875. He was secretary to the Bureau of Awards at the 1876 Centennial Exposition in Philadelphia, and served as a manager of the Twin City Gas Company in LaSalle, Illinois. During his time in Illinois, he was a member of the Illinois National Guard, rising to the rank of Sergeant.

He moved to California in 1883 and worked for his father's law practice in Benecia before he helped organize the Cucamonga Fruit Land Company of San Bernardino County in 1886. He was vice president and a general manager of the company and was part of a land development project which involved 65,000 acres of land having infrastructure such as roads and irrigation pipelines built on it, before being subdivided and sold.

California Politics 
An active Republican, Lynch represented his party at various state and county conventions. He was elected to the California State Assembly in 1890 from the 79th district, he was re-elected to the Assembly in 1892, having been redistricted to the 78th district, serving until 1897. Between January and March of 1895, he served as Speaker of the Assembly.

During his tenure in the state legislature, he was an ex-officio member of the University of California Board of Regents for two years.

Later Career 
Between 1907 and 1908, Lynch served as a state Bank examiner, and eventually moved to Alaska where he was treasurer of the Alaska Treasure Mining Company and receiver for the Pacific Coast Casualty Company after 1916.

References 

Speakers of the California State Assembly
1851 births

20th-century deaths
Year of death missing